The Lichinaceae are a family of ascomycete fungi. Most species are lichenized with cyanobacteria, and have a distribution largely in temperate regions.

Taxonomy

The family was circumscribed in 1854 by Finnish lichenologist William Nylander. His description of the family mentioned the obscure brown thallus resembling algae, with an overall morphology described as either filamentous or tufted (fruticose). The fruiting structures, the apothecia, are described as either endocarpous or biatorine. He included two tribes in the Lichinaceae: Ephebeae, which contained the genera  Ephebe and Gonionema, and Lichineae, which contained Lichina, the type genus.

In 1986, Aino Henssen and Burkhard Büdel proposed the order Lichinales to contain the Lichinaceae. In the 1980s and 1990s, several taxonomic and nomenclatural studies were the basis for the revision of many of the species in the family.

Heppiaceae was a family proposed by Alexander Zahlbruckner in 1906 to contain the genus Heppia. It was considered to differ from the Peltulaceae in the polysporous asci, the rostrate type of ascus (i.e., having a beaklike process), the type of photobiont, and the thallus anatomy. Heppiaceae was typically included in the order Lecanorales, while the Peltulaceae was included in the Lichinales. Molecular phylogenetic methods showed that the genus Heppia forms a clade nested within the Lichinaceae, and so Heppiaceae was synonymized with Lichinaceae in 2003.

First informally proposed by Antonín Vězda in 1974, then formally published in 1984 by Josef Hafellner, the family Harpidiaceae contains the genera Harpidium and Euopsis. Although some authoritative sources have folded the Harpidiaceae into the Lichinaceae, some other authorities have preferred to treat the Harpidiaceae as a distinct, independent family. For example, in the Outline of the Ascomycota, the genera were included in the Lichinaceae. In a corrected and amended version of the "2016 classification of lichenized fungi in the Ascomycota and Basidiomycota", the Harpidiaceae was added as Pezizomycotina incertae sedis, a placement followed by recent (2022) review of fungal classification.

Description

The photobiont partner for the majority of species is cyanobacterial. The form of the ascomata is apotheciate, usually zeorine, immersed or adnate, often pycnoascocarps, rarely thallinocarps. The  (the hyphae or other tissues between the asci) consist of unbranched to branched paraphyses, amyloid or non-amyloid. Asci are either prototunicate or unitunicate, and either amyloid or non-amyloid. Ascospores are simple, spherical to ellipsoid in shape, hyaline, and non-amyloid. The conidiomata are in the form of pycnidia. The conidia are non-septate, ellipsoid or bacilliform, rarely  or filiform to sigmoid, and hyaline. No lichen products are made. Most species in the family are saxicolous (rock-dwelling) or terrestrial, while some species are corticolous (bark-dwelling).

Genera

, Species Fungorum (in the Catalogue of Life) accepts 45 genera and 126 species in the family Lichinaceae.

Anema  – 21 spp.
Calotrichopsis  – 4 spp.
Corynecystis  – 1 sp.
Cryptothele  – 7 spp.
Digitothyrea  – 3 spp.
Edwardiella  – 1 sp.
Ephebe  – 13 spp.
Finkia  – 1 sp.
Gyrocollema  – 2 spp.
Heppia  – 4 spp.
Jenmania  – 2 spp.
Lecidopyrenopsis  – 1 sp.
Lemmopsis  – 3 spp.
Lempholemma  – 35 spp.
Leprocollema  – 3 spp.
Lichina  – 9 spp.
Lichinella  – 30 spp.
Mawsonia  – 1 sp.
Metamelanea  – 3 spp.
Paulia  – 10 spp.
Peccania  – 3 spp.
Phloeopeccania  – 4 spp.
Phylliscidiopsis  – 1 sp.
Phylliscidium  – 1 sp.
Phyllisciella  – 3 spp.
Phylliscum  – 8 spp.
Porocyphus  – 8 spp.
Pseudarctomia  – 1 sp.
Pseudoheppia  – 1 sp.
Pseudopaulia  – 1 sp.
Psorotichia  – 50 spp.
Pterygiopsis  – 17 spp.
Pyrenocarpon  – 1 sp.
Pyrenopsis  – 40 spp.
Solorinaria  – 1 sp.
Stromatella  – 1 sp.
Synalissa  – 30 spp.
Thallinocarpon  – 2 spp.
Thelignya  – 2 spp.
Thermutis  – 2 spp.
Thermutopsis  – 1 sp.
Thyrea  – 13 spp.
Watsoniomyces  – 1 sp.
Zahlbrucknerella  – 10 spp.

The genus Lichinodium, formerly placed in Lichinaceae, was placed in its own family (Lichinodiaceae) and order (Lichinodiales) in the class Leotiomycetes.

References

Lichinomycetes
Ascomycota families
Lichen families
Taxa described in 1854
Taxa named by William Nylander (botanist)